Naseer Ahmed Malik (February 1, 1950 – August 1, 1999) was a Pakistani cricketer who played three ODIs in 1975. He was born in Faisalabad, Punjab. Malik took 203 first-class wickets at 24.89, 121 for National Bank of Pakistan. He is survived by his four children.

References

1950 births
1999 deaths
Pakistan One Day International cricketers
Cricketers at the 1975 Cricket World Cup
National Bank of Pakistan cricketers
Cricketers from Faisalabad
Karachi Whites cricketers
Khairpur cricketers
Sindh cricketers